The United States competed at the 2015 Parapan American Games held in Toronto, Canada.

Medalists

Archery

Athletics

Cycling 

The United States finished in 1st place in the cycling medal table.

Football 7-a-side 

The United States finished in 5th place out of 5 teams.

Goalball 

The United States won the silver medal in both the men's tournament and women's tournament.

Judo

Sitting volleyball 

The United States won the gold medal in the women's tournament and the silver medal in the men's tournament.

Swimming

Table tennis

Wheelchair basketball 

Both the men's tournament and women's tournament were won by the United States.

Wheelchair rugby 

The United States won the silver medal in the wheelchair rugby tournament.

Wheelchair tennis 

In total, two silver medals and two bronze medals were won in wheelchair tennis.

See also 
United States at the 2015 Pan American Games

References 

2015 in American sports
Nations at the 2015 Parapan American Games